The Waipu River is a river in the Northland Region of the North Island of New Zealand. It runs close to the town of Waipu. The river is popular with birdwatchers as species such as the New Zealand dotterel, oystercatchers and fairy terns live near it.

References 

Whangarei District
Rivers of the Northland Region
Rivers of New Zealand